Squash may refer to:

Sports
 Squash (sport), the high-speed racquet sport also known as squash racquets
 Squash (professional wrestling), an extremely one-sided match in professional wrestling
 Squash tennis, a game similar to squash but played with equipment more related to that of tennis

Food and beverages
 Squash (drink), a drink made of concentrated fruit syrup or fructose
 Squash (fruit), the fruit of vines of the genus Cucurbita
 Tuborg Squash, a Danish orange-flavoured soft drink

Other uses
 Squash (film), an Academy Award-nominated short film about a squash game
 SquashFS, a read-only file system
 SQUASH, Squatters' Action for Secure Homes, an activist group in the United Kingdom

See also